The 2019–20 Tunisian Super Cup was the 16th edition of the Tunisian Super Cup. The match was contested between the 2019–20 Tunisian Ligue Professionnelle 1 champions, Espérance Sportive de Tunis and the 2019–20 Tunisian Cup winners, US Monastir.  The match took place at Stade Hammadi Agrebi in Radès, Tunis on 18 September 2021 with US Monastir winning on penalties after a 1-1 draw.

Match

Pre-match

Venue 
Stade Hammadi Agrebi, formerly known as Stade 7 Novembre is a multi-purpose stadium in Radès, Tunis, Tunisia about 10 kilometers south-east of the city center of Tunis, in the center of the Olympic City. It is currently used mostly for football matches and it also has facilities for athletics. The stadium holds 65,000 and was built in 2001 for the 2001 Mediterranean Games and is considered to be one of the best stadiums in Africa.

Match details

Broadcasting

See also 

2019–20 Tunisian Ligue Professionnelle 1
2019–20 Tunisian Cup

Notes

References

External links 

Tunisian Super Cup
Supercup